Rhagovelia rivale is a species of smaller water strider in the family Veliidae. It is found in North America.

References

Veliidae
Articles created by Qbugbot
Insects described in 1924